Mikhail Torrance (born September 30, 1988) is an American professional basketball  player. He is a  combo guard. Torrance had previously attended the University of Alabama where he played for the Crimson Tide.

High school
Graduated from Mary G. Montgomery High School, in Semmes, Alabama...averaged 22 points, eight assists and seven rebounds as a senior...averaged 18.5 points, four rebounds and eight assists as a junior...a First-Team All-State selection in 2005 and 2006...the 2006 Mobile Optimist Club Class 6A Player of the Year...member of the First-Team of the Mobile Press-Register Sweet 16 in 2005 and 2006...an All-County selection in 2005 and 2006...scored 37 points in a game against Biloxi...made 14 assists in a game against LeFlore...played AAU ball for the Alabama Challenge (based in Birmingham)...coached by John Davis at Mary G. Montgomery High School...led the school to back-to-back 20-win seasons in 2003-04 and 2004–05

College

University of Alabama

2006-07 (freshman)
Averaged only 3.0 points and 1.0 rebounds on the season in 11.7 minutes per game playing only 21 of Alabama's 32 games. Scored season high the 14 points against Auburn in Tuscaloosa on Feb 24, making 5 of 10 shots from the field, 2 of 3 from three-point range and 2 of 2 at the free throw line (played a season-high 27 minutes against Auburn.

2007-08 (sophomore)
Averaged 3.3 points and 2.4 assists in 12.2 minutes per game this time played in 30 of 33 games, starting in three games. Made his first collegiate start in the Mercer game.

2008-09 (junior)
His junior year was his first breakout year averaged 10.0 points 2.3 assists playing 21.5 minutes per game playing 28 games this season .

2009-10 (senior)
As a senior Torrance had his best season averaging 15.6 points, 5.1 assists per game in 32.6 minutes playing in all 32 games. He only had 3 games under double figures in points, scoring a season high 26 on November 20, 2010 against Providence. Torrance later posted a season high 11 assists against LSU. His last game for the Crimson Tide was in a loss against the Kentucky Wildcats during the 2010 SEC men's basketball tournament quarterfinals. Torrance lead the team in scoring, finishing with 20 points.

Pro career
Torrance went undrafted in the 2010 NBA Draft although many say the reason for this wasn't his playing abilities but due to his diagnosed heart problem known as "athletic heart" which means his heart is "a little bit bigger than normal". Important to add he was cleared to play by various tests before the draft. He played on the Miami Heat's Summer League Roster but didn't receive a contract offer.

He later started playing Turkish Basketball for Second League team Ormanspor.

Collapse
On August 20, 2010 Torrance collapsed during the first five minutes of a light workout.

References

External links
Alabama Crimson Tide bio
FIBA.com profile

1988 births
Living people
Alabama Crimson Tide men's basketball players
American expatriate basketball people in Canada
American expatriate basketball people in the Dominican Republic
American expatriate basketball people in Finland
American expatriate basketball people in Mexico
American expatriate basketball people in Turkey
American men's basketball players
Basketball players from Alabama
Frayles de Guasave players
Moncton Miracles players
People from Mobile County, Alabama
Point guards
Shooting guards